Albergo Roma (Hotel Rome) is a 1996 Italian comedy film directed by Ugo Chiti. It was screened at the 53rd Venice International Film Festival, in which Chiti won the Kodak Award.

For her performance Lucia Poli won a Nastro d'Argento for best supporting actress.

Cast 
 Alessandro Benvenuti: Tonchio
 Deborah Caprioglio: Ginecriste
  : Peppina
 Claudio Bisio: Danilo Giorgini
 Tchéky Karyo: Federale Apolloni 
 Giorgio Panariello:  Maresciallo  
 Cecilia Dazzi: Milenina 
 Carlo Monni: Don Urbano
 Alessandra Acciai: Ottavia
 : Dr. Goffredo
 Lucia Poli: Viola La Sarta
 : Mrs. Olimpia
 Novello Novelli: Senior saxophone player
 Massimo Ceccherini: gang member
 : gang member
 : Miss Mirella Salimbeni
 :Mrs. Salimbeni
 :Adina Giorgini

References

External links

1996 films
1996 comedy films
Italian comedy films
Films set in Tuscany
1990s Italian-language films
1990s Italian films